Winston George (born 19 May 1987 in Georgetown, Guyana) is a Guyanese sprinter. He competed in the 400 m event at the 2012 Summer Olympics. He was the flag bearer of Guyana during the 2012 Summer Olympics opening ceremony.  He was also named Guyana's Male Athlete of the Year in 2011 and 2013 by the Athletics Association of Guyana.

Personal bests
200 m: 20.53 s (wind: +2.0 m/s) – Clermont, Florida, 14 May 2016
400 m: 45.25 s –  Beijing (National Stadium), 23 Aug 2015

International competitions

1Disqualified in the semifinals

References

External links

Sports reference biography
Tilastopaja biography

1987 births
Living people
Guyanese male sprinters
Olympic athletes of Guyana
Athletes (track and field) at the 2012 Summer Olympics
Athletes (track and field) at the 2016 Summer Olympics
Athletes (track and field) at the 2011 Pan American Games
Athletes (track and field) at the 2015 Pan American Games
Pan American Games competitors for Guyana
Athletes (track and field) at the 2014 Commonwealth Games
Athletes (track and field) at the 2018 Commonwealth Games
Commonwealth Games competitors for Guyana
Sportspeople from Georgetown, Guyana
World Athletics Championships athletes for Guyana
Afro-Guyanese people
Competitors at the 2014 Central American and Caribbean Games
Competitors at the 2018 Central American and Caribbean Games
Athletes (track and field) at the 2018 South American Games
South American Games bronze medalists for Guyana
South American Games medalists in athletics
Islamic Solidarity Games medalists in athletics
20th-century Guyanese people
21st-century Guyanese people